The 23rd Academy of Country Music Awards ceremony was held on March 21, 1988, at Knott's Berry Farm, Buena Park, California. it was hosted by Reba McEntire and Hank Williams Jr.. This would be the last ACM Awards show to be held at Knott's Berry Farm.

Winners and nominees 
Winners are shown in bold.

References 

Academy of Country Music Awards
Academy of Country Music Awards
Academy of Country Music Awards
Academy of Country Music Awards
Academy of Country Music Awards